Seniors and Juniors is a 1999 album and the first studio album by Elephant 6 affiliate band Marshmallow Coast.

Track listing

References  

1999 albums
Marshmallow Coast albums
Kindercore Records albums